van Deventer may refer to:

People
van Deventer is a surname of Dutch origin. It is sometimes written as Van Deventer, Vandeventer or VanDeventer. Notable people with the name include:

 Algernon Foster van Deventer (1862–1931), American politician
 Andre van Deventer (born 1930), South African Army officer and politician
 Anelle van Deventer (born 1993), South African field hockey player
 Conrad Theodor van Deventer (1857–1915), Dutch lawyer, author, and politician
 Denise van Deventer (born 1990), Dutch international cricketer
 Emmy van Deventer (1915–1998), Dutch ceramist
 Gesie van Deventer (born 1958), South African politician, farmer and advocate
 Jacob van Deventer (cartographer) (c. 1500–1575), Dutch cartographer of the Renaissance
 Jacob van Deventer (general) (1874–1922), South African military commander
 Jayvin Van Deventer (born 2004), American soccer player 
 John H. Van Deventer (1881–1956), American engineering writer
 Juan van Deventer (born 1983), South African Olympic distance runner
 Just van Deventer (1906–1957), Dutch ceramist
 Kobus Van Deventer, South African rugby player
 Oskar van Deventer (born 1965), Dutch puzzlemaker

Animals
 VanDeventer's rock gecko, (Cnemaspis vandeventeri), a species of gecko endemic to central Thailand, named after biologist Ryan J. VanDeventer

Other uses
 Vandeventer, St. Louis, a neighborhood of St. Louis, Missouri
 Vandeventer Flat, a flat in Riverside County, California

See also
Van Devanter

Afrikaans-language surnames
Dutch-language surnames
Surnames of Dutch origin